Rudolf Seifert is a retired East German slalom canoeist who competed in the 1950s and the 1960s. He won four medals at the ICF Canoe Slalom World Championships with three golds (C-2 team: 1959, 1963; Mixed C-2 team: 1957) and a bronze (Mixed C-2: 1957).

References

1934 births
Living people
People from Spremberg
People from the Province of Brandenburg
German male canoeists
Sportspeople from Brandenburg
Medalists at the ICF Canoe Slalom World Championships